Julian Pitzer Graham, nicknamed “Spike” (March 13, 1886 – October 14, 1963) was an American photographer. His legacy is over 40,000 photographs and negatives of many famous people that visited and lived on the Monterey Peninsula. Between 1924 and 1963, Graham, was an independent, official photographer for Del Monte Properties, which is known today as the Pebble Beach Company. His photographs appeared in magazines such as Life and National Geographic, national and international newspapers, books, fashion layouts, and promotional material used for advertising the Pebble Beach Company. Graham's photographs chronicle the history of the Monterey Peninsula which includes the creation of Cypress Point Golf Club, Pebble Beach Golf Links and the Monterey Peninsula Country Club. His career lasted 39 years until his death at his home in Carmel Valley, California on March 13, 1963.

Early life and education

Julian P. Graham was born March 13, 1886, and grew up in the Washington, D.C. His parents were Horace Alexander Graham and Laura E. Wright. He was nicknamed “Spike” from his early years as a semi-pro baseball player. He married Elva Mae White on January 18, 1906, in Rockville, Maryland. They had two children. He married a second time to Alief Jeannette Farden on November 4, 1910, in New York City. They had four children. He married a third time to Gwenn Campbell on August 12, 1944, in San Francisco, California. She was the Del Monte Press Bureau director.

Career

Graham traveled the United States as a photographer and in the 1920s arrived in Carmel-by-the-Sea, California. He met and worked for James Franklin Devendorf of the Carmel Development Company, who introduced him to Johan Hagemeyer, a photographer and artistic academic. Graham and Hagemeyer grew to be close friends. This friendship help refine his photographic skills. Graham was also friends with Ansel Adams, a landscape photographer.

In February 1924, S. F. B. Morse, the chairman of the Board of Del Monte Properties Co., land management firm, offered Graham, at age 38, a job at the Hotel Del Monte, which is now the Naval Postgraduate School. Graham's original studio was in the hotel from 1924 to 1944. In the fire of 1924 that razed the hotel, many of Graham's negatives were lost. Graham set up a temporary darkroom in the bowling alley at the Del Monte Baths in Monterey.

In November 1937, Graham worked with Herbert Cerwin, a public relations person for the Del Monte Lodge, now The Lodge at Pebble Beach. They traveled to Canton to cover the USS Panay incident. Graham as a foreign war photographer and Cerwin as a reporter. Graham took photographs of the bombing attack on the U.S. Navy river gunboat  and three Standard Oil Company tankers on the Yangtze River. Their travels are set down in Cerwin's book, “In Search of Something, the Memoirs of a Public Relations Man”.

During World War II, Graham's moved his studio and Camera Shop to Menlo Park, California for a brief time. In 1944, he moved his studio across from the main entrance to The Del Monte Lodge at Pebble Beach, where it remained until his death.

Notable works

Graham became an independent "official Photographer" for S. F. B. Morse. He photographed Kings and Queens, Presidents of the United States, heads of Governments, movie stars, artists, and major golf champions. Graham's photographs include the Crosby Clambake, polo matches, sailing regattas, and the Pebble Beach Concours d'Elegance which his wife, Gwenn Campbell Graham, created and ran for 18 years until her death in October 1968. Other photographs include car races, dog shows, horse shows, three-day event for hunter/jumpers, horse racing, and steeplechases. Graham photographed gun shooting events, tennis stars, archery, diving, and artistic scenes of the Monterey Peninsula. Graham also photographed the creation of the Pasatiempo Golf Club in Santa Cruz, California, with images of the Scottish golf architect, Alister MacKenzie, and the amateur golfer, Marion Hollins.

His photographs include Bobby Jones, Robinson Jeffers, Johnny Goodman, Walter Hagen, Chandler Egan, Jack Neville, Francis Ouimet, Tommy Armour, Lloyd Mangrum, Ben Hogan, Sam Snead, Babe Didrickson, Clara Callender, Jimmy Demaret, Jack Burke Jr., Arnold Palmer, Byron Nelson, and Gary Player.

Legacy 
Today, Graham's photographs can be seen behind the reception desk at The Lodge at Pebble Beach; the Tap Room restaurant and various shops at The Lodge; on the 17-Mile Drive at the #10 viewing point stop; the Poppy Hills Golf Course; the Monterey Peninsula Country Club; and the Inn at Spanish Bay. The largest display of Grahams’ photos are in the Men's Locker Room at Cypress Point Club.

Graham's photographs appear in many books including:
 
 Pebble Beach Golf Links by Neal Hotelling
 Alister MacKenzie’s Cypress Point Club by Geoff Shackelford
 The Life and Work of Dr. Alister MacKenzie by Tom Doak, James S. Scott and Raymond M. Haddock
 Crosby: Greatest Show in Golf by Dwayne Netland
 The Monterey Peninsula, an Enchanted Lane by Randall A. Reinstedt
 Pebble Beach Concours d’Elegance, The Art of the Poster by Robert T Devlin and Kandace Hawkinson
 Monterey Peninsula Country Club, Pebble Beach, The First Fifty Years 1925-1975, by the Monterey Peninsula Country Club
 Johnny Goodman: The last Amateur Golfer to Win the United States Open by Walter John Curtis
 Champion in a Man’s World: The Biography of Marion Hollins by David Outerbridge
 Pebble Beach, A Matter of Style by Robert T. Devlin

The Julian P. Graham Photograph Collection at the Bancroft Library at the University of California, Berkeley, contains the approximately 13,200 photographic prints and negatives which made up Graham's personal archive at the time of his death in 1963.

Death
Graham, at age 77, died on October 14, 1963, of a heart attack at his home in Carmel Valley, California. Funeral services were held in Pacific Grove, California.

See also
 Pebble Beach, California

References

External links
 
 
 Julian P. Graham - Getty Museum
 Julian P. Graham Collection of Photographic Negatives
 J. P. Graham, Del Monte, Calif., photographer

1886 births
1963 deaths
Photographers from California
20th-century American photographers
People from Carmel Valley, California
People from Pebble Beach, California